Wallace C. English (born June 28, 1939) is a former American football coach. He was on Tommy Hudspeth's coaching staff with the Detroit Lions until the entire group was dismissed on January 9, 1978. He was the head football coach at Tulane University from 1983 to 1984, compiling a record of 5–17. In 2003, English was hired to replace Jeff Brohm as the head coach of the Louisville Fire af2 team. He was fired after just two games with a record of 2–2.

Head coaching record

College

AF2

References

1939 births
Living people
BYU Cougars football coaches
Detroit Lions coaches
Hawaii Rainbow Warriors football coaches
Kentucky Wildcats football coaches
Louisville Fire coaches
Miami Dolphins coaches
Ohio Glory coaches
Pittsburgh Panthers football coaches
Tulane Green Wave football coaches
Sportspeople from Louisville, Kentucky